The Garlyn Zoo is a zoo located in Mackinac County, Michigan.  At , it is the largest zoo in the eastern Upper Peninsula of Michigan.

History
The Garlyn Zoo was started when Gary and Lynn found some property for sale near Naubinway. They started the zoo with some animals that they had already been raising, like pot-bellied pigs, pygmy goats, pheasants, peacocks and sika deer. They lived in an unfinished garage for six years, and sold their truck to pay for food. Since then, the zoo has grown to contain animals that are larger and more exotic, including tigers, lions, a bear, many reptiles and amphibians, alpacas, a bison, hyenas, alligators, fruit bats, koi, cougars, bobcats, tortoises and much more.

Location
The zoo is located between Naubinway, Michigan, and Epoufette, Michigan, on US 2.  It sits just across the roadway from Lake Michigan and its beaches.

Attractions
The zoo features cedar mulched trails through the nature forest, a souvenir shop and a snack bar. There is RV and bus parking.  There is also a petting zoo.

Animals

Mammals

Birds

Reptiles and amphibians

Fish
Koi

References

External links 

Zoos in Michigan
Buildings and structures in Mackinac County, Michigan
Landmarks in Michigan
1993 establishments in Michigan
Tourist attractions in Mackinac County, Michigan